James J. Sullivan School is a historic elementary school located in the Frankford neighborhood of Philadelphia, Pennsylvania. It is part of the School District of Philadelphia. The building was designed by Irwin T. Catharine and built in 1929–1930. It is a three-story, eight-bay, yellow brick building on a raised basement in the Art Deco style. It features an arched entryway with terra cotta trim and pilasters, a terra cotta cornice, and brick parapet.

It was added to the National Register of Historic Places in 1988.

References

External links

School buildings on the National Register of Historic Places in Philadelphia
Art Deco architecture in Pennsylvania
School buildings completed in 1930
Frankford, Philadelphia
Public elementary schools in Philadelphia
School District of Philadelphia
1930 establishments in Pennsylvania